Long Semirang is a settlement in the Marudi division of Sarawak, Malaysia.

About seven Penan families have settled in the nearby village of Lond Medamot and have learnt the skills of rice farming from Kelabits in Long Manau and Long Semirang.

Neighbouring settlements include:

References

Villages in Sarawak